This is a list of law schools in South Africa.

Law schools

Mooting in South Africa 
The following moot court competitions are either held in South Africa or organised by a South Africa institution:

See also
 Bachelor of Laws: South Africa
 Doctor of law: South Africa
 Law of South Africa
 Legal education in South Africa
 List of universities in South Africa
 Lists of law schools
 Master of Laws: South Africa

Notes

References
 

South Africa
Legal education in South Africa
 
Law schools